Marion Wilson may refer to:
 Marion Wilson (boxer) (born 1956), American heavyweight boxer
 Marion Wilson (murderer) (1976–2019), American convicted murderer
 Marion Wilson (artist), American artist and professor